Ballynaclonagh is a townland in County Westmeath, Ireland.

Ballynaclonagh is one of 14 townlands of the civil parish of Multyfarnham in the barony of Corkaree in the Province of Leinster.

The neighbouring townlands are: Donore to the north–east, Abbeyland to the east, Multyfarnham to the east, Rathganny to the south and Soho to the west and north.

In the 1911 census of Ireland there were 2 houses and 10 inhabitants in the townland.

References

External links
Map of Ballynaclonagh at openstreetmap.org
Ballynaclonagh at the IreAtlas Townland Data Base
Ballynaclonagh at Townlands.ie
Ballynaclonagh at The Placenames Database of Ireland

Townlands of County Westmeath